The GWR 1101 Class was a class of 0-4-0T side tank steam locomotives built by the Avonside Engine Company to the order of the Great Western Railway in 1926 for dock shunting.

British Railways
They passed into British Railways ownership in 1948 and were numbered 1101–1106.

Withdrawal

All were withdrawn between 1959 and 1960 with all of them being scrapped with none being preserved.

Sources
 Ian Allan ABC of British Railways Locomotives, winter 1957/8 edition, part 1, page 24

External links
 Model of 1101 Class dock tank
 Rail UK database entry

1101
0-4-0T locomotives
Avonside locomotives
Railway locomotives introduced in 1926
Scrapped locomotives
Standard gauge steam locomotives of Great Britain

Shunting locomotives